Margaret Sibthorp ( – 23 May 1916) was an English feminist activist, writer, magazine editor and theosophist. She founded, then edited the "pioneering women's periodical" Shafts from 1892 until 1899. Sibthorp described it as "the outgoing of my vital breath; the result of the anxious yearning of my inmost spirit; the manifestation of my deep desire to serve the cause of women".

Sibthorp became a member of the Theosophical Society in 1891, which was reflected in Shafts' extensive coverage of occult and psychical topics. In 1909 she became a founding member of the League of Isis, which promoted Frances Swiney's views on the importance of healthy motherhood and the fundamental right of women to regulate sexual intercourse.

References

1830s births
1916 deaths
19th-century British journalists
19th-century English women writers
British magazine founders
English feminists

English magazine editors
English occultists
English occult writers
English Theosophists